Centromere protein C 1 is a protein that in humans is encoded by the CENPC1 gene.

Centromere protein C 1 is a centromere autoantigen and a component of the inner kinetochore plate. The protein is required for maintaining proper kinetochore size and a timely transition to anaphase. A putative pseudogene exists on chromosome 12.

References

External links

Further reading